Alessandro Santin (born 6 October 1958 in Venice, Italy) is an Italian former race car driver.

Santin's main title was in the Italian Formula Three Championship in 1984, in which he drove a Ralt-Alfa to four wins. From 1985 to 1988, Santin drove in the European Formula 3000 championship for many teams (Sanremo in 1985; Coloni, Sanremo, Lola Sport, Eddie Jordan Racing and Formula Team in 1986; Genoa in 1987 and Eddie Jordan Racing in 1988), without great results. His better results were two sixth places in Silverstone and Vallelunga in 1986, driving a Lola T86/50. His best start position was in Mugello in 1986, when he started from the second position, also driving a Lola T86/50.

Santin has also raced in prototypes championships and drove in the 1989 Le Mans 24 Hours with Pascal Fabre. Nowadays, he attends historical Formula 3 events in Italy.

Racing record

Complete International Formula 3000 results
(key) (Races in bold indicate pole position; races in italics indicate fastest lap.)

External links
Driver Database Profile

Italian racing drivers
Italian Formula Three Championship drivers
World Touring Car Championship drivers
1958 births
Living people
International Formula 3000 drivers
World Sportscar Championship drivers
24 Hours of Spa drivers

Scuderia Coloni drivers